Eduardo Lizalde Chávez (14 July 1929 – 25 May 2022) was a Mexican poet, academic and administrator.

Lizalde was known as "El Tigre" for recurring themes in his work which stem from his childhood fondness for the stories of Salgari and Kipling. As he explains: "The tiger has been a fascinating figure from Biblical times until now, and I don't believe there has ever been a writer who has never made a reference to tigers. The tiger is an image of death, destruction and, also, of beauty..."

Career
Lizalde was born in Mexico City in 1929. His father, an engineer, taught him to read at an early age and introduced him to literature. He also began writing early and published his first short poems in 1948, at the age of eighteen, in the magazine El Universal. His first full book of poems, La Mala Hora, was published when he was 27. While studying literature at the National Autonomous University of Mexico (UNAM), he also attended night classes at the National Conservatory of Music.

In 1955, he became a member of the Communist Party of Mexico, but was expelled at the beginning of the 1960s, together with José Revueltas. He and Revueltas then founded the "Liga Leninista Espártaco", an alternative movement with which they both soon became disenchanted.

Shortly thereafter Lizalde, Enrique González Rojo, and Marco Antonio Montes de Oca started Poeticísmo, a literary movement which quickly fizzled out. Lizalde himself severely criticized the movement in his book Autobiografía de un Fracaso ("Autobiography of a Failure"), in which he said the movement's goal to create poetry with "originality, clarity and complexity" was so vague that, in reality, "there was nothing". In fact, despite his continuing efforts to promote Mexican literature, Lizalde has expressed dissatisfaction with his own work and poetry in general, of which he has frequently said "no sirve para nada" (it's useless).

He has served as the director of the Casa del Lago at UNAM and has held several positions at the Secretariat of Public Education. He was also the director of the José Vasconcelos Library and co-hosted Contrapunto, a weekday radio program from the Instituto Mexicano de la Radio (IMER).

Awards and honors
 1970: Awarded the Xavier Villaurrutia Prize
 1988: Awarded the Premio Nacional de Lingüística y Literatura 
 2002: Awarded the Premio Iberoamericano Ramón López Velarde
 2007: Elected to the Academia Mexicana de la Lengua
 2011: Awarded the Alfonso Reyes International Prize
 2016: Awarded the Carlos Fuentes International Prize for Literary Creation in the Spanish Language

Selected works
 La Zorra Enferma, Mortiz (1974)
 Caza Mayor, UNAM (1979) 
 Autobiografía de un Fracaso. El Poeticísmo, INBA (1981) 
 Memoria del Tigre, Katún (1983)  
 ¡Tigre, Tigre!, Fondo de Cultura Económica (1985) 
 Antología Impersonal, SEP Cultura (1986) 
 Tabernarios y Eróticos, Vuelta (1988) 
 Almanaque de Cuentos y Ficciones (1955-2005), ERA (2010) 
 El Tigre en la Casa, Valparaíso (2013)

References

External links
 Perfil de Eduardo Lizalde, by Luis Ignacio Helguera in Letras Libres. 
 A Media Voz: Selected poems by Lizalde

1929 births
2022 deaths
Mexican male poets
Writers from Mexico City
20th-century Mexican poets
20th-century Mexican male writers
21st-century Mexican poets
21st-century Mexican male writers
National Autonomous University of Mexico alumni
National Conservatory of Music of Mexico alumni
Academic staff of the National Autonomous University of Mexico